UKF is a record label founded by Luke Hood and AEI Group that focuses on promoting electronic music. UKF Music was created by Luke Hood, who began sharing bass music through his original two YouTube Channels, UKF Drum & Bass and UKF Dubstep, in 2009. The UKF brand now has five YouTube Channels: UKF Music, UKF Dubstep, UKF Drum & Bass, UKF Mixes and UKF On Air. UKF has expanded beyond its YouTube Channels to creating compilation series and podcasts, organizing events, offering merchandise as well as its own ticketing platform.

History
Luke Hood created UKF on YouTube to share music with friends while studying at Frome Community College in 2009. As his subscriber base began to grow, he started to focus on the music channels and expanding the UKF brand. The brand has since sold half of its ownership to AEI Media and plans to take advantage of YouTube's live streaming function to broadcast their events that now occur throughout Europe and North America.

The name UKF stands for United Kingdom and Frome, Luke Hood's hometown.

In January 2012 Your Hidden Potential, a UK-based platform for aspiring entrepreneurs, named Luke Hood one of the top 20 young entrepreneurs to watch. At the 2012 Red Bull Elektropedia Awards in Belgium, UKF took home the award for 'Best Really Big Party', and an award for Visual Iconography for both of their sell out shows in Belgium.

In October 2019, UKF held a ten-year anniversary event in the Cheese and Grain hall in Frome.

Compilation albums

References

Electronic music organizations
Electronic music event management companies
Festival organizations in Europe
2009 establishments in the United Kingdom
British companies established in 2009
YouTube channels launched in 2009
Record labels established in 2009